The 2014–15 Serbian SuperLiga (known as the Jelen SuperLiga for sponsorship reasons) was the ninth season of the Serbian SuperLiga since its establishment.

Teams 
The league contains 16 teams. 14 teams from the 2013–14 Serbian SuperLiga and two new teams Borac Čačak and Mladost Lučani.

Stadiums and locations

Personnel and kits

Note: Flags indicate national team as has been defined under FIFA eligibility rules. Players and Managers may hold more than one non-FIFA nationality.

Nike is the official ball supplier for Serbian SuperLiga.

Transfers
For the list of transfers involving SuperLiga clubs during 2014–15 season, please see: List of Serbian football transfers summer 2014 and List of Serbian football transfers winter 2014-15.

League table

Results 
All clubs play each other twice, once at home and once away. Giving a total of 30 matches to be played per team.

Play-off

Top goalscorers

Hat-tricks

5 Player scored five goals

Awards

Team of the Season

References

External links
 Official website

Serbian SuperLiga seasons
1
Serbia